Deutscher Brauer-Bund e.V. ('DBB, "German Brewers Federation"), based in Berlin is "a federation of federations", in which the members are not individual brewers but only technical and regional federations of members. Deutscher Brauer-Bund is a member of the Brewers of Europe.

History 

The Deutscher Brauer-Bund was founded in Dresden in July 1871.

Tasks 

 Perception and promotion of the common interests of the entire brewing economy in the Federal Republic of Germany
 Promotion of a fair and the fight of the mean competition
 Promotion of exchange of experience; in particular, in economic, legal, and technical areas
 Preservation and promotion of the good reputation of German beer and installation for the receipt Reinheitsgebot

Members

Regional Federations 

 Bayerischer Brauerbund e.V. (Bavarian Brewers Federation)
 Brauersozietät Mitte (Central Brewers Society)
 Sozietät Norddeutscher Brauereiverbände e.V. (Partnership of North Germans Brewery Federations)
 Süd-Westdeutsche Brauersocietät (South West German Brewers Society)
 Verband Rheinisch-Westfälischer Brauereien e.V. (Federation of Rhenish-Westphalian Breweries)

Professional Associations 
 Verband bayerischer Ausfuhrbrauereien e.V. (Federation of Bavarian Export Breweries)
 Verband der Ausfuhrbrauereien Nord-, West- und Südwestdeutschlands e.V. (Federation of Export Breweries of North-, West and Southwest Germany)

The Ambassadors of Beer 

Since the year 2002 Deutscher Brauer-Bund has appointed, on 23 April which is "the Day of German Beer",  "the Ambassadors of Beer". This honor is given to people who make an unusual commitment to the day. This commitment can be, for example, an energetic and exemplary employment for the German beer or special honorary, vocational, social or political activities or trend-setting initiatives.

References

External links
Website of the German Brewers Federation 

Beer organizations
German beer culture